Conaghan is a surname. Notable people with this surname include: 

 Brian Conaghan (born 1971), Scottish author
 Hugh Conaghan (1926–2020), Irish politician and transport official
 Joanne Conaghan, British legal scholar
 Michael Conaghan (born 1944), Irish politician 
 Pat Conaghan (born 1971), Australian politician
 Tom Conaghan, Irish Gaelic football player and manager

See also
 Harry Cunningham (activist) (born Henry Conaghan, 1891–1938) Irish-American activist 
 Dorothy Conaghan Chiles (born 1930) American politician